Tmetuchl may refer to:

 Mlib Tmetuchl, Palauan businessman and politician
 Roman Tmetuchl, Palauan political leader and businessman